"Money on My Mind" is a song by English singer Sam Smith, and the second single from their debut studio album, In the Lonely Hour (2014). The song was released in Italy on 27 December 2013. It was later released in the UK on 12 February 2014 and in Germany on 16 February 2014.

The song peaked at number one on the UK Singles Chart and number 4 on the Irish Singles Chart. The song also charted in Austria, Belgium, Denmark, Germany and the Netherlands. The song was written by Sam Smith and Ben Ash, produced by Two Inch Punch (Ben Ash) and mixed by Steve Fitzmaurice, with vocals recorded by Steve Fitzmaurice and Darren Heelis.

Music video
A music video to accompany the release of "Money on My Mind" was directed by Jamie Thraves and first released onto YouTube on 12 January 2014 at a total length of three minutes and thirty-two seconds. The video shows Smith performing the track in Las Vegas, as people win and lose money in the casino capital.

Critical reception
Robert Copsey of Digital Spy gave the song a mixed review, calling its chorus "a lazy search for a hook." In his debut piece for Noisey, Robert Christgau reviewed In the Lonely Hour and cited Money on My Mind as a highlight of the album, calling it "an emotionally complex reflection on their record deal".

Formats and track listings

CD single
"Money on My Mind" — 3:14
"Money on My Mind"  — 6:35

Digital download 
"Money on My Mind" — 3:14
"Money on My Mind"  — 6:35
"Money on My Mind"  — 3:03
"Money on My Mind"  — 3:42

Charts and certifications

Weekly charts

Year-end charts

Certifications and sales

|-

Release history

References

2013 songs
2014 singles
Sam Smith (singer) songs
Number-one singles in Scotland
UK Singles Chart number-one singles
Capitol Records singles
Songs written by Sam Smith (singer)
Songs written by Two Inch Punch